Blanch (formerly, Blanche) is an unincorporated community in Dan River Township, Caswell County, North Carolina, between North Carolina Highway 86, and North Carolina Highway 62, at an elevation of 387 feet (118 m).

References

Unincorporated communities in North Carolina
Unincorporated communities in Caswell County, North Carolina